Vice Admiral Biswajit Dasgupta, PVSM, AVSM, YSM, VSM is a serving Flag officer in the Indian Navy. He currently serves as the Flag Officer Commanding-in-Chief, Eastern Naval Command. He had earlier served as the Chief of Staff of ENC from 2020 to 2021, Controller of Personnel Services at Naval HQ from 2019 to 2020 and as the Flag Officer Commanding Eastern Fleet (FOCEF) from 2016 to 2018.

Early life and education
Dasgupta graduated from the National Defence Academy, Pune.

Naval career 
Dasgupta was commissioned into the Indian Navy in the Executive branch in 1985. He is a specialist in Navigation and Direction. He has served as the flag lieutenant to the Director General of the Indian Coast Guard. He also served briefly as the Deputy Squadron Commander of the Chukar Aerial Target Squadron.

He has completed the staff course at the Defence Services Command and Staff College (DSCSC) in Dhaka, Bangladesh, the higher command course at the Army War College, Mhow. He has also attended the National Defence College, New Delhi.

He has also served as the second-in-command of the  INS Astravahini.

Dasgupta has served as the Fleet Operations Officer of the Western Fleet. In his staff appointments, he has served as the Commander Work Up and as the Staff Officer (ND) at Naval HQ. In his instructional appointments, Dasgupta has served as directing staff at the Defence Services Staff College, Wellington and as the Officer-in-Charge Navigation and Direction School. As a commodore, Dasgupta served as the Naval Assistant (NA) to the Chief of the Naval Staff.

Flag Rank
On promotion to flag rank, Dasgupta took over as the Chief Staff Officer (Operations) (CSO Ops) at the Western Naval Command. As the CSO Ops, he played a pivotal role in planning and conducting Operation Neer. He also led the planning and successful execution of Operation Raahat during the Saudi Arabian-led intervention in Yemen. For these two operations, he was awarded the Yudh Seva Medal (YSM).

The citation for the YSM reads as follows:

On 14 October 2016, Dasgupta assumed the office of Flag Officer Commanding Eastern Fleet, taking over from Rear Admiral S. V. Bhokare. For his command of the Eastern Fleet, Dasgupta was awarded the Ati Vishisht Seva Medal on 26 January 2018. He handed over charge of the Eastern Fleet to Rear Admiral Dinesh K Tripathi on 15 January 2018.

On 12 June 2019,  on promotion to the rank of Vice Admiral, Dasgupta took over as the Controller of Personnel Services at Naval Headquarters. On 12 June 2020, he took over as the Chief of Staff of the Eastern Naval Command from Vice Admiral Satish Namdeo Ghormade.

He took over the reins as Flag Officer Commanding-in-Chief, Eastern Naval Command succeeding Vice Admiral Ajendra Bahadur Singh on 1 December 2021.

Awards and decorations
He was awarded PVSM on 26 January 2023.

See also
 Flag Officer Commanding Eastern Fleet
 Eastern Fleet

References 

Indian Navy admirals
Flag Officers Commanding Eastern Fleet
Recipients of the Ati Vishisht Seva Medal
National Defence Academy (India) alumni
Living people
Year of birth missing (living people)
National Defence College, India alumni
Recipients of the Yudh Seva Medal
Recipients of the Vishisht Seva Medal
Army War College, Mhow alumni
Academic staff of the Defence Services Staff College